Yab-yum (Tibetan:  literally, "father-mother") is a common symbol in the Tibetan Buddhist art of India, Bhutan, Nepal, and Tibet. It represents the primordial union of wisdom and compassion, depicted as a male deity in union with his female consort through the similar ideas of interpenetration or "coalescence" (Wylie: zung-'jug;), using the concept of Indra's net to illustrate this. The male figure represents compassion and skillful means, while the female partner represents insight. In yab-yum the female is seated on the male's lap. There is a rare presentation of a similar figure but reversed, with the male sitting on the female's lap, called yum-yab.

Origins
The symbolism is associated with Anuttarayoga tantra and, while there are various interpretations of the symbolism in twilight language, the male figure is usually linked to compassion and skillful means (upāya-kauśalya), while the female partner is linked to "wisdom" (prajñā).

Iconography

Yab-yum is generally understood to represent the primordial (or mystical) union of wisdom and compassion. In Buddhism the masculine form is active, representing the compassion and skillful means (upaya) that have to be developed in order to reach enlightenment. The feminine form is passive and represents wisdom (prajna), which is also necessary to enlightenment. United, the figures symbolize the union necessary to overcome the veils of Maya, the false duality of object and subject.

These figures are frequently worked in the shape of statues or reliefs, or are painted on thangkas. Yab-yum may also be represented through the aniconic signification of yantra and mandala.

Tibetan Buddhism
In Tibetan Buddhism, the same ideas are to be found concerning the bell and the dorje, which, like the yab-yum, symbolize the dualism that must be transcended. The sacred Tantric practice leads to rapid development of mind by using the experience of bliss, non-duality, and ecstasy while in communion with one's consort, either visualized, or in the case of advanced practitioners, in some cases physical. In one important Anuttarayoga text, where Tilopa expounds the meaning to Naropa, it is said:

Indicating the advanced nature of the actual practice with consort, the verses are the last in what is already widely considered as a text for the most advanced practitioners, a fact clearly evident in the story about Naropa's receiving the teaching.

Sadhana
The symbolism of union and sexual polarity is a central teaching in Tantric Buddhism, especially in Tibet. The union is realised by the practitioner as a mystical experience within one's own body. Yab-yum represents the practice of the karmamudrā or "action-seal", a tantric yoga involving a physical partner.

Gallery

See also
 Maithuna

Footnotes

External links
 

Tantric practices
Tibetan Buddhist art and culture
Buddhism and sexuality
Buddhist iconography